Several ships of the Swedish Navy have been named HSwMS Näcken, named after the mythological water spirit:

 , a  launched in 1942 and decommissioned in 1966
 , a  launched in 1978 and decommissioned in 2005

Swedish Navy ship names